Giant Panda Guerilla Dub Squad is an American reggae and jam band from Rochester, New York, founded in 2001 and known for their live performances and authentic roots reggae and dub sound.

History

Formation (2001)

Giant Panda Guerilla Dub Squad was formed in 2001 when brothers Chris O'Brian on drums and Matt O'Brian on guitar teamed up with their childhood friend, James Searl on vocals and bass. They started playing shows in their hometown of Rochester, New York and then moved to Ithaca, New York. The band based their name on the fictional "Giant Panda Gypsy Blues Band" from Another Roadside Attraction by Tom Robbins.

GPGDS' electric mix of roots, reggae, and dub music that combines world beats and reggae rhythm with jam band aesthetics. They are committed to "connecting people with the great music; roots and dub for your mediation." The band have been noted for their live shows, which are often recorded by concert tapers and posted on Etree and the Internet Archive.

Slow Down (2006)
In 2006, GPGDS solidified their sound by adding local Rochester guitarist Dylan Savage, Aaron Lipp on vocals/percussion/keys and Rachel Orke on keyboard.

The band's debut album Slow Down was released in 2006 and received regular airplay on Sirius and XM Radio. The album was recorded at Pyramid Sound Studios in Ithaca, New York, and produced by the band and Alex Perialas.

Soon after, they recorded a live acoustic session at Moboogie Loft in Denver, Colorado.

Touring and Live Up! albums (2008–2011)
On May 30, 2008, the band played at Warren Haynes' Mountain Jam Festival at Hunter Mountain Ski Resort in upstate New York.

In 2009, the band released a live recordings album titled, Live Up!. The album features 11 tracks that were recorded during their 2008 and 2009 national tours.

Founding member Matt O'Brian and keyboard player Rachel Orke left the band in 2010.

The band also released Live Up!! Volume II on September 2, 2010, featuring 10 live recordings from the band's Southeast USA tour. They also played at the 2010 All Good Music Festival gaining further notoriety in the jam band circuit.

In 2011, the band added guitarist Dan Keller from North Tonawanda, New York on lead guitar, rhythm guitar, vocals, and harmony.

On July 23, 2011 the band played the Gathering of The Vibes music festival in Bridgeport, Connecticut. They also returned to the All Good Music Festival for the second consecutive year.

Country and In These Times (2012)
The band released their second studio album, Country on January 31, 2012, on the California-based record label Controlled Substance Sound Labs. With this release, the quintet has charted new territory and put together a lyrically driven roots Americana-music and folk album.

On April 10, 2012, the band released their third studio album, (a full electric album), In These Times, also on the Controlled Substance Sound Labs label. The 'psychedelic roots' sound is more familiar to fans who were familiar with the band through concerts and live recordings. The album peaked at #5 on the Billboard Reggae Albums Chart.

The band's music was featured on NPR's radio program All Things Considered on January 28, 2012.

Steady (2013)
Keyboardist Tony Gallicchio, another Rochester local, joined the band in place of departing keyboard player Aaron Lipp.

In 2013, the band recorded their fourth album, Steady which was co-produced by Craig Welsch of 10 Foot Ganja Plant. Steady hit #1 on the Billboard Reggae Album chart on October 9, 2014.

Bright Days (2015)
In 2015, the band released their fifth album (and second 'Americana' album), Bright Days on Easy Star Records. It features nine original songs recorded at the Rear Window Studio in Brookline, Massachusetts.

Make It Better (2016)
On September 16, 2016, the band released their sixth album called, Make It Better on Rootfire Cooperative, featuring ten new tracks. The album was recorded in their hometown of Rochester, New York at Blackdog Studios owned by former band member Matt Goodwin. The band also prepared some tracks at Scanhope Sound in Littleton, Colorado. This album was mixed by Danny Kalb who also co-produced. Make it Better debuted at the #1 spot on Billboard and the iTunes reggae charts.

Singles and dub version songs (2019–present)
The band released the singles, "Good Love", "Cool It", "Stop Fighting" in 2019. The same year, in February, guitarist Dan Keller played his last show with the band. GPGDS then added guitarist Eli Flynn from upstate New York band Upward Groove that spring.

GPGDS then released dub versions of their previous songs in 2020, featuring Victor Rice, Pachyman, and Agent Jay.

In 2021, the band released more singles during the spring and summer titled, "Solidarity" with Kevin Kinsella (on April 2), "Really True (The Scientist Dub)", (on May 21) "Hold You Tonight" (on July 2) and "Narita" (on August 20). They also continued touring in the U.S. in the summer and fall on the east coast.

Musical style and influences 
The band has many different musical influences. Some of them include: Phish, Sublime, John Brown's Body, The Wailers, Bunny Wailer, Burning Spear, Lee Scratch Perry, Bob Marley, and The Grateful Dead.

Musical collaborations
Giant Panda Guerilla Dub Squad has collaborated with many different artists on stage and in the studio. Their album Bright Days includes "Humboldt County Gold" featuring G. Love on harmonic.

On the 2014 release Steady, the band collaborated with reggae legend Ranking Joe on the track "Take Your Place."

Elliot Martin from John Brown's Body contributed vocals on the track "Really True" on the band's 2017 release Make It Better.

Italian-American musicologist Dougie "Roast Beef" Ducker, best known as "the man who brought Reggae to Biloxi", has covered several of the band's songs live, and dedicated a reggae-tinged cover of P.O.D's "Alive" to his so-called "Panda Bros".

Lineup

Current members
Chris O'Brian – Drums, Vocals (2001–Present)
James Searl – Bass, Vocals (2001–Present)
Dylan Savage – Guitar, Vocals (2006–Present)
Tony Gallicchio – Keyboard (2013–Present)
Eli Flynn – Guitar, Vocals (2019–Present)

Past members
Matthew O'Brian – Guitar, Vocals (2001–2010)
Aaron Lipp – Keyboard, Percussion, Vocals (2006–2013)
Rachel Orke – Keyboard (2006–2010)
Dan Keller – Lead Guitar, Piano, Vocals (2011–2019)
Matt Goodwin – Keyboard, Organ, Production (2013–2014)

Discography

Studio albums

Live albums

Singles

See also

 List of jam bands
 List of reggae musicians
 Music of New York

References

External links
 , the band's official website
 
 Live Recordings from Internet Archive

2004 establishments in New York (state)
21st-century American musicians
American reggae musical groups
Americana music groups
Jam bands
Musical groups established in 2004
Musical groups from Rochester, New York
Musical quintets
Organizations based in Rochester, New York
Easy Star Records artists